Prioniodinida is an extinct order of conodonts, a jawless vertebrate.

Families
Families are:
 †Bactrognathidae
 †Chirognathidae
 †Ellisoniidae
 †Gondolellidae
 †Prioniodinidae

References 

 Sweet, W. C; P. C.J Donoghue (2001). "Conodonts: past, present, future". Journal of Paleontology 75 (6): 1174.

External links 

 
 Prioniodinida at biolib.cz (retrieved 22 April 2016)
 Prioniodinida at fossilworks.org (retrieved 22 April 2016)

 
Prehistoric jawless fish orders